Gandikovvur is a village in Chakrayapet mandal in Cuddapah district in Andhra Pradesh. India.

References

Villages in Kadapa district